Carditida is an order of marine bivalve clams.

Superfamilies and families 
According to the World Register of Marine Species:

 Family: †Archaeocardiidae

Superfamily: Carditoidea
 Family: Carditidae
 Family: Condylocardiidae
Superfamily: Crassatelloidea
 Family: Crassatellidae
 Family: Astartidae

 Family: †Eodonidae

Notes:

 Previously in 2010, Condylocardiidae was classified in its own superfamily, Condylocardioidea.
 Carditida does not yet exist in the ITIS classification, with its families instead being included in Venerida.

References

External links 

 
 
 

 
Bivalve orders